Steatoda rufoannulata, is a species of spider of the genus Steatoda. It is found in India, Java, Sri Lanka, and Sumatra.

See also 
 List of Theridiidae species

References

Steatoda
Spiders of Asia
Spiders described in 1899